Lubor Blažek (born 28 February 1954) is a Czech basketball coach. At the 2012 Summer Olympics he coached the Czech Republic women's national basketball team.

References

Living people
1954 births
Czech basketball coaches
Place of birth missing (living people)